Juho Pirttijoki (born 30 July 1996) is a Finnish professional footballer who plays for Lahti as a defender.

Club career
Pirttijoki has played for Haka, Hämeenlinna, HIFK, GIF Sundsvall and KuPS.

On 9 February 2022, Pirttijoki signed a contract with Lahti for the 2022 season, with an option for 2023.

International
He made his debut for Finland national football team on 11 January 2018 in a friendly against Jordan.

References

External links

1996 births
People from Akaa
Living people
Finnish footballers
Finland international footballers
FC Haka players
FC Hämeenlinna players
HIFK Fotboll players
GIF Sundsvall players
Kuopion Palloseura players
FC Lahti players
Kakkonen players
Ykkönen players
Veikkausliiga players
Association football defenders
Finnish expatriate footballers
Finnish expatriate sportspeople in Sweden
Expatriate footballers in Sweden
Allsvenskan players
Sportspeople from Pirkanmaa